The Canadian National Badminton Championships is a tournament organized to crown the best badminton players in Canada.

The tournament started in 1922. In 1957 the Canadian Badminton Federation decided to open the championships and they were combined with the Canadian Open until 1961. In 1962 they were held separately again.

Past winners

Canadian National Championships

Canadian National Championships and Canadian Open together

Canadian National Championships

External links
2013 Yonex Canadian National Championships
2014 Yonex Canadian National Championships
2015 Yonex Canadian National Championships
2016 Yonex Canadian National Championships
2017 Yonex Canadian National Championships
2018 Yonex Canadian National Championships

Badminton tournaments in Canada
National badminton championships
Recurring sporting events established in 1922
1922 establishments in Canada
National championships in Canada